Western Carolina Catamounts basketball may refer to either of the basketball teams that represent Western Carolina University:

Western Carolina Catamounts men's basketball
Western Carolina Catamounts women's basketball